Silvia Rocca (born 1983) is an Italian ski mountaineer.

Selected results 
 2010:
 1st, World Championship relay race (together with Roberta Pedranzini and Francesca Martinelli)
 3rd, World Championship team race (together with Corinne Clos)
 8th, World Championship single race
 8th, World Championship combination ranking

Trofeo Mezzalama 

 2009: 2nd, together with Orietta Calliari and Corinne Clos

Pierra Menta 

 2010: 3rd, together with Corinne Clos

Patrouille des Glaciers 

 2010: 2nd, together with Roberta Pedranzini and Francesca Martinelli

References 

1983 births
Living people
Italian female ski mountaineers
World ski mountaineering champions